The MLS Young Player of the Year Award (known as the Rookie of the Year Award from 1996 to 2019) is an annual award given to the top player in Major League Soccer under the age of 22. 

The award was initially awarded to a rookie, or a player who no prior professional experience, usually to players that had previously played in MLS youth team academies or played college soccer. This practice is fairly common in other American sports leagues, such as the MLB Rookie of the Year (baseball), NASCAR Rookie of the Year (motorsports), NFL Rookie of the Year Award (American football), the Eddie Gottlieb Trophy (basketball), and the Calder Memorial Trophy (ice hockey).

In 2020, MLS replaced the Rookie of the Year Award with the MLS Young Player of the Year Award, given to the best player in the league aged 22 and under, regardless of prior professional playing experience.

Winners

Rookie of the Year Award (1996–2019)

Young Player of the Year Award (2020–present)

Wins by playing position

Wins by nationality

Wins by team

References

Rookie of the Year Award
Association football young player of the year awards
Rookie player awards